The Pacification, England and Scotland Act 1640 (16 Cha. 1 c 17) was an Act of Parliament passed by the Long Parliament. Its full title was "An Act for the Pacification between England and Scotland".

The Act declared that those who resumed fighting "ought to be punished as breakers of the peace" and that amnesty "shall not...extend to...theeves, robbers, murtherers, broaken-men [and] outlawers".

Notes

External links
Full text at British History Online

Acts of the Parliament of England
1640 in law